is a Japanese athlete. He competed in the men's pole vault at the 1964 Summer Olympics.

References

1942 births
Living people
Athletes (track and field) at the 1964 Summer Olympics
Japanese male pole vaulters
Olympic athletes of Japan
Place of birth missing (living people)